The city of Fukuoka, Fukuoka Prefecture, Japan held a mayoral election on November 19, 2006. Hiroshi Yoshida, nominated by the DPJ and the SDP won over incumbent Hirotaro Yamasaki, backed by LDP

Sources 
 Japan Election coverage

Events in Fukuoka
2006 elections in Japan
Mayoral elections in Japan
November 2006 events in Japan